The Graham Building (built 1911) is a yellow-brick Romanesque Revival style commercial building in downtown Bangor, Maine, at the corner of Harlow and Central Streets.  It is one of the most prominent buildings in the Great Fire of 1911 Historic District, which is listed on the National Register of Historic Places.

Designed by architect Wilfred E. Mansur, the building was commissioned by John R. Graham (1847–1915), president of the Bangor Hydro-Electric Company, formerly the Bangor Railway and Electric Company. Graham was largely responsible for managing Bangor's turn-of-the-century transition from lumber port to light industrial center through the provision of cheap electricity from dams across the Union River in Ellsworth, Maine and the Penobscot River at Veazie, Maine.  Bangor was the first city in New England (and one of the first in the United States) with an electric street railroad system, thanks to an earlier local businessman, Francis Clergue, who went on to build one of North America's greatest hydro-power centers at Sault Ste. Marie, Ontario. Graham came to consolidate and manage Bangor's electrical utilities through his connections to the General Electric Corporation, which held a number of local investments.

The Graham Building was one of the first to be commissioned and finished following the disastrous Great Fire of 1911 which destroyed half of Bangor's commercial district.  It stands six stories tall, and is built of yellow pressed brick with a metal cornice. It originally housed the offices of the Bangor Hydro-Electric Company and the Bangor and Aroostook Railroad, among others.  The first story once housed the Post Office Pharmacy, and is currently occupied by a curated retail store, The Willie Wags, while the Central Street entrance is housed by 98 Wake N' Shake.  The upper floors of the building are occupied by the owners of the building, Rudman Winchell, Counselors at Law.

A previous Graham Building, also named for John R. Graham, was located on an adjacent lot on Central Street, and was destroyed in the 1911 fire.

References

Buildings and structures completed in 1911
Buildings and structures in Bangor, Maine
Romanesque Revival architecture in Maine
Historic district contributing properties in Maine
Bangor and Aroostook Railroad
National Register of Historic Places in Bangor, Maine
Commercial buildings on the National Register of Historic Places in Maine
1911 establishments in Maine